The Bonnycastle family of Canada include:

 Sir Richard Henry Bonnycastle (1791-1847), British soldier
 Henry William John Bonnycastle (1813-1888), lawyer, militiaman, farmer, councillor, artist 
 Angus Bonnycastle (1873-1941), lawyer, politician, judge
 Richard H. G. Bonnycastle (1903-1968), lawyer, fur trader, adventurer, book publisher who owned Harlequin Enterprises
 Richard A. N. Bonnycastle (b. 1934), book publisher, investor, conservationist, racehorse owner/breeder

Canadian families